MedFlight is a non-profit, CAMTS-accredited critical care transport organization.  MedFlight's headquarters is in Columbus, Ohio at the Ohio State University Airport (Don Scott Field) with nine helicopter bases and 3 Mobile ICU ground teams.   Helicopter Aviation services are contracted to MedFlight through Metro Aviation, Inc.

Helicopter Base Locations 

 MedFlight 1:  Chillicothe, OH
 MedFlight 2:  Marysville, OH
 MedFlight 3:  Pomeroy, OH
 MedFlight 4:  Coshocton, OH
 MedFlight 5:  Galion, OH
 MedFlight 6:  McConnelsville, OH
 MedFlight 7:  Portsmouth, OH (A shared base with Healthnet Aeromedical Services)
 MedFlight 8:  Eaton, OH
 MedFlight 9:  Jeffersonville, OH

Mobile ICU Locations

 MedFlight 11:  Columbus, OH
 MedFlight 12:  Columbus, OH
 MedFlight 14:  Chillicothe, OH

References

External links
MedFlight Website

Air ambulance services in the United States
Medical and health organizations based in Ohio